Tone: Live Tour 2012 (stylized as Tohohsinki Live Tour 2012 ～TONE～), also known as the Tone Tour, was the fifth Japanese concert tour (eighth overall) by South Korean pop group Tohoshinki, in support of their fifth Japanese studio album Tone (2011). The Tone Tour was Tohoshinki's first concert in three years, and the first tour by the group since becoming a two-piece band with members Yunho and Changmin.

The tour ran for 26 shows, visiting ten cities in Japan. According to S.M. Entertainment, the tour grossed US$73.8 million in ticket sales and US$19.4 million in merchandise, bringing the total gross to US$93.2 million. Tohoshinki were the third foreign artists, and the first Korean artists, to headline a concert at the Tokyo Dome for three days in a row, performing to over 165,000 people in three days. In addition, the Tone Tour attracted over 550,000 people, the highest attendance for a music concert by a Korean artist in Japan at the time. Tohoshinki broke their own record the following year with their Time: Live Tour 2013, which drew in 850,000 people.

Background
Live Tour 2012: Tone was first announced through Tohoshinki's official website in December 2011. Originally scheduled for only 20 shows, six more dates were added throughout the duration of the tour.

Setlist
This setlist is representative of their first show in Yokohama. It does not represent all dates throughout the tour.

"B.U.T. (BE-AU-TY)"
"Superstar"
"I Think U Know"
 (Japanese version)

"Thank You My Girl"
"Introduction ~magenta~"
"MAXIMUM" (Japanese version)
"Honey Funny Bunny" (Yunho solo) (Japanese version)
"Before U Go" (Japanese version)
"Duet"
"I Don't Know"
"Telephone"

"Back to Tomorrow"
"Rusty Nail" (Changmin solo)
"BREAK OUT!"
"Easy Mind"
"Summer Dream"
"High Time"
"Why? (Keep Your Head Down)" (Japanese version)
Encore
 "Rising Sun" (Japanese version)
 "STILL"
 "Shine"
 "Weep"
 "Somebody to Love"

Tour dates

References

External links
Tone Tour Official website 

2012 concert tours
TVXQ concert tours

ja:東方神起 LIVE TOUR 2012 〜TONE〜
ko:5th LIVE TOUR 2012 ~TONE~